Pathari is a town in Vidisha district, Many tourist attractions  in the Indian state of Madhya Pradesh.

Geography
It is located close to a lake on a hillock with an elevation of 550 metres. There are ancient ruins and caves close to the town in an area known as Badoh-Pathari.

History

During the British Raj era, Pathari was the capital of Pathari State, one of several princely states of the Central India Agency. Pathari State was established by the Nawabzada Hayder Mohammad Khan of Orakzai Clan Mirazikhel tribe. The State of Bhopal and Rahatgarh later Rahatgarh state become Pathari after losing rule over Rahatgarh by East India Company was founded in 1723 by Sardar Dost Muhammad Khan, from Tirah in Afghanistan, a descendant of the Mirazi Khel branch of the Warakzais (Orakzai) Pathans. He entered the service of Emperor Aurangzeb and had been appointed Governor of Bhairsa. Taking advantage of the disintegrating of the Mughal Empire, he declared his independence and found a separate state. Bhopal and Rahatgarh divided between two sons of Nawab Dost Mohammad Khan Nawab Yar Mohammad Khan got reign over Bhopal State and Nawab Sultan Mohammad Khan over Rahatgarh later became Pathari State.

Religious Importance

9th century built Gadarmal Jain Temple & vanmandir Jain Temple is situated here .

See also
List of Monuments of National Importance in Madhya Pradesh/East

References

Bhopal, Bhopal State

Cities and towns in Vidisha district
Former capital cities in India